Herbie, the Love Bug is an American television sitcom that aired on CBS from March 17 to April 14, 1982. It was produced by Walt Disney Productions and based on a series of films about Herbie, a white 1963 Volkswagen racing Beetle with a mind of its own.

The show was a five-episode mid-season replacement series. It was the last production to feature the titular automobile until 1997's television film The Love Bug. The show's theme song "Herbie, My Best Friend" was performed by its star, Dean Jones.

Plot
Dean Jones, who had appeared in two of the films (The Love Bug and Herbie Goes to Monte Carlo), reprises his role of Jim Douglas, Herbie's original owner, now a retired race car driver who works as an instructor at the Famous Driving School with his partner Bo Phillips (Richard Paul). He and Herbie stumble upon a bank robbery in progress. They manage to thwart the crime and rescue a young divorcée named Susan MacLane (Patricia Harty), who works at the bank and is a mother of three: Julie (Claudia Wells), Robbie (Douglas Emerson) and Matthew (Nicky Katt). Jim and Susan soon begin to fall in love, much to the consternation of her ex-boyfriend Randy Bigelow (Larry Linville). Randy's attempts to break them up are in vain; Jim and Susan get married in "Herbie the Best Man" episode that aired on April 7.

Cast
Dean Jones as James "Jim" Douglas
Patricia Harty as Susan MacLane
Richard Paul as Bo Phillips
Claudia Wells as Julie MacLane
Douglas Emerson as Robbie MacLane
Nicky Katt as Matthew MacLane
Bryan Utman as Jason
Larry Linville as Randy Bigelow
Natalie Core as Mrs. Bigelow

Episodes

Home media
The series has not become available on DVD, Blu-ray, or Disney+.

Premiere in Brazil
The series premiered on Brazilian television on January 10, 1993, on TV Globo, on Sunday mornings and then at various times, being the only country to broadcast the program on a Latin American open TV network.

References

External links

1982 American television series debuts
1982 American television series endings
1980s American sitcoms
1980s American children's television series
American children's television sitcoms
CBS original programming
Herbie films
Television series by Disney
Television series based on Disney films
Television series based on adaptations
Television shows set in Los Angeles
Live action television shows based on films